Gotro is a 2019 Indian Bengali-language emotional drama film, directed, produced and co-written by Nandita Roy and Shiboprosad Mukherjee. It stars Anashua Majumdar, Nigel Akkara and Manali Dey, with Ambarish Bhattacharya, Saheb Chatterjee and Badshah Moitra. The film revolves around the relationship between Mukti Debi (Majumdar), a widow who lives alone in her mansion (her son being settled abroad), with her caretaker Tareq (Akkara), an ex-convict and shows how their lives undergo a change.

The story for Gotro was conceived by Roy, when she learned about the relationship between Mukherjee's mother and her caretaker. Roy eventually wrote the film's screenplay, while she and Mukherjee co-wrote the story. This marked their second film after Icche (2011), focusing on mother-son relationship. Supriyo Dutta handled the cinematography while Moloy Laha edited the film. Anindya Chatterjee composed the film's soundtrack, which received favourable reviews on release.

Gotro was released on 23 August 2019. It received mixed to positive reviews from critics. Majumdar's performance won high appraisals; criticism was however, drawn towards Akkara's performance. Nevertheless, the film was a commercial success, grossing  in its theatrical run. The soundtrack album of the film was highly successful. At the 4th Filmfare Awards Bangla, it received three nominations under Best Male Playback and Best Female Playback categories, but did not win any.

Synopsis 
Gotro is a story of faith, love and belief, revolving around Mukti Debi, an educated woman, who lives in an old-world mansion named Gobinda Dham while her son, Anirban, is settled abroad with his family. Tareq Ali is a former convict who is now trying to redeem himself and restart his life. He is employed by Anirban as the caretaker of his mother and her estate. What follows is a tale of how a mother-son relationship begins to build between Mukti Debi and Tareq, while the former is unaware of his Muslim identity, depicting the underlying social issue of the era. Mukti Debi and Tareq discover the meaning of life as they unfold love for each other and she started loving her as her own son. Gotro is a sweet take on the mother-son relationship with a message of communal harmony.

Cast 
 Anashua Majumdar as Mukti Debi
 Nigel Akkara as Tareq Ali/Tarak Guha
 Ambarish Bhattacharya as a priest
 Saheb Chatterjee as Mukti Debi's son, Anirban
 Manali Dey as Jhuma
 Badshah Moitra as Police Inspector Ritam, Anirban's friend
 Kharaj Mukherjee as Shakun Bapi
 Biswanath Basu in a special appearance in "Mashima Hitler" song
 Santu Mukhopadhyay as Sajal Da
 Devlina Kumar and Om Sahani in a special appearance in "Rongoboti" song
 Aditi Munshi in a special appearance in “Srikrishno Kirton”

Production
According to Mukherjee, long ago, Nigel Akkara had sent a young boy to his home at Baranagar as they were looking for a caretaker. After some days, the boy informed Mukherjee that he felt he wasn't fit for the job. On being asked why, he replied that Mukherjee's mother had been teaching him the texts of Rabindranath Tagore and he couldn't understand any of those. This formed the core plot for Gotro.

Nandita Roy opted for Anashua Majumdar to pick up the character traits of Mukherjee's mother. Majumdar revealed being moved by the character Mukti Devi; especially when she learned that it had been inspired by Shiboprosad's mother. She also admitted of having some similarities with the character, though she had no belief in caste and creed discrimination. Nigel Akkara, who had gained fame through the film Muktodhara, was signed on for one of the leads. Recalling about his experience, Akkara said that the filming has been one of the best times of his life and he has been inspired by the way people approached him and praised him. Manali Dey was cast as Jhuma; she expressed her excitement on being a part of the film and opined that her character personified a "flying butterfly". Actors Saheb Chatterjee, Kharaj Mukherjee and Tota Roy Chowdhury were signed on for other pivotal roles. Later, Roy Chowdhury, however, was replaced by Badshah Moitra.

During the initial stages of production, Mukherjee and Roy were reluctant to talk about the film's theme and casting; they wanted people to guess it. It marked their second collaboration in 2019 after their recent outing Konttho, released six weeks prior to Gotro. Upon its completion, the film was slated for release on the occasion of Krishna Janmashtami in August 2019. Speaking to The Times of India, Mukherjee addressed the film to be yet "another moving human story" alike their other films. Being based on a social subject (this was consistently reported), the film caused great hype and anticipation in the media even before its release.

Release and reception 
Gotro was released on 23 August 2019, coinciding with Janmashtami. Owing to its social theme, the film became one of the rare Bengali films to be released nationwide. It enjoyed full houses for almost all its shows across Bengal, and completed a 100 day run at the Box office. Having opened to a tremendous response in the first week, with its sales improving in the second week, the film emerged a highly successful venture. The subject of the film was seen appealing to people of all ages.

Soundtrack

The soundtrack is composed by Anindya Chatterjee. The song, Rongoboti, is inspired by the famous Odia song by the same name. It received enormous appreciation from the audience. The music album is one of the best in the last five years in terms of song reach, music album and awards. Rongoboti alone has a reach of 160+ million views on YouTube.

References

External links
 

2019 films
Bengali-language Indian films
2010s Bengali-language films
Indian drama films
Films directed by Nandita Roy and Shiboprosad Mukherjee